Phil Anselmo (born June 30, 1968 in New Orleans, Louisiana) is an American vocalist who is best known as the frontman of heavy metal bands Pantera, Down, and Superjoint.

Philip H. Anselmo & The Illegals

with Pantera

with Down

with Superjoint Ritual

with Arson Anthem

with Christ Inversion
Obey the Will of Hell (1994) (guitar and backing vocals)
13th Century Luciferian Rites (1995) (guitar and backing vocals)

with Necrophagia
Holocausto de la Morte (1998) (guitar)
Black Blood Vomitorium EP (2000) (guitar)
Cannibal Holocaust EP (2001) (guitar)
Draped in Treachery (2005) (guitar)

with Southern Isolation
 Southern Isolation EP (2001) (vocals, guitar)

with Viking Crown

with Scour
 The Grey EP (2016) (vocals)
 The Red EP (2017) (vocals)
 The Black EP (2020) (vocals)

with En Minor
"On the Floor" / "There's a Long Way to Go" (single, 2019) (vocals)
When the Cold Truth Has Worn Its Miserable Welcome Out (2020) (vocals)

Guest appearances
 With Crowbar – Crowbar (1993) (guest; producer)
 With Crowbar – Broken Glass (1996) (guest; backing vocals)
 With Anal Cunt – 40 More Reasons to Hate Us (1996) (guest; vocals and guitars)
 With Soilent Green – Sewn Mouth Secrets (1998) (guest; backing vocals)
 With Anthrax – Volume 8: The Threat Is Real (1998) (guest; backing vocals on "Killing Box")
 With Vision of Disorder – Imprint (1998) (guest; vocals on "By the River")
 With Iommi – Iommi (2000) (guest; vocals and lyrics on "Time Is Mine")
 With Biohazard – Uncivilization (2001) (guest; backing vocals on "HFFK")
 With Jarboe – Mahakali (2008) (guest; vocals on "Overthrown")
 With Metal Allegiance – Metal Allegiance  (2015) (guest; vocals on "Dying Song")
 With Cattle Decapitation – The Anthropocene Extinction (2015) (guest; narration on "The Prophets of Loss")

Other releases
2017: Songs of Darkness and Despair (EP, as "Bill + Phil" with Bill Moseley) (vocals)

References
  

Anselmo, Phil
Anselmo, Phil